The European Physical Journal H: Historical Perspectives on Contemporary Physics (EPJ H) is a quarterly peer-reviewed academic journal which focuses on the history of modern physics. It is the newest journal from the European Physical Journal series. It was established in 1976 as the Annales de Physique and obtained its current title in July 2010.

EPJ H is published by Springer Science+Business Media and the editors-in-chief are Michael Eckert (Deutsches Museum München) and James D. Wells (University of Michigan).

Abstracting and indexing 
The journal is indexed and abstracted in Chemical Abstracts Service, Science Citation Index Expanded, Scopus, Astrophysics Data System, Academic OneFile, and Current Contents/Physical, Chemical and Earth Sciences. According to the Journal Citation Reports, the journal has a 2016 impact factor of 0.436.

References

Further reading

External links 
 

History of physics journals
Springer Science+Business Media academic journals
EDP Sciences academic journals
Publications established in 2010
Quarterly journals
English-language journals